Yurkov (Russian, Ukrainian: Юрко́в) is a Russian and Ukrainian surname that may refer to:

 Andrey Yurkov (born 1983), Russian bobsledder
 Oleksandr Yurkov (born 1975), Ukrainian decathlete

Russian-language surnames
Ukrainian-language surnames